Agenoria may refer to:

 Agenoria (mythology), a minor ancient Roman goddess who promoted activity
 Agenoria (locomotive), a locomotive built by Foster, Rastrick and Company